Bremo may refer to:

Bremo Bluff, Virginia
Bremo Historic District, which includes Bremo Plantation and the areas of Bremo Recess, Lower Bremo and Upper Bremo
Bremo Slave Chapel